Robert Chalmers (2 October 1945 – 28 May 2013) was a South African cricketer. He played seventeen first-class matches for Northerns between 1963 and 1971.

References

External links
 

1945 births
2013 deaths
South African cricketers
Northerns cricketers
People from Benoni
Sportspeople from Gauteng